WGUS-FM 102.7 is a mix of soft adult contemporary and normal adult contemporary radio station licensed to New Ellenton, South Carolina, but is part of the Augusta, Georgia radio market. The station is licensed by the FCC to broadcast on 102.7 FM with an ERP of 4.3 kW. Its studios are located just two blocks from the Augusta-Richmond County border in unincorporated Columbia County, Georgia and the transmitter is east of Aiken, South Carolina.

History
102.7 signed on in 1990 as WAJY with an adult standards format as "Joy 102.7". In 2004, it became Contemporary Christian under the Joy 102.7 moniker for a brief time before being sold to Beasley Broadcasting, who moved WGOR's oldies format from 93.9 FM to 102.7 FM in October 2004, becoming "Oldies 102.7".

On October 27, 2006 WGOR-FM switched to Christmas music for the season as "Santa 102.7." The station changed formats on December 26 of that year, revealing its southern gospel format under the WGUS-FM call letters.

This was not the first time that the WGUS-FM call letters were used in the Augusta market. Before the 1990s, the WGUS-FM call letters were on 102.3 FM (now WIBL).

The station is owned by the Beasley Broadcast Group, Inc., through licensee Beasley Media Group, LLC.

On August 28, 2020, WGUS-FM changed their format from southern gospel to soft AC, branded as "Sunny 102.7".

See also

Media in Augusta, Georgia

References

External links
WGUS-FM — official website

GUS-FM
Radio stations established in 1989
GUS-FM
Soft adult contemporary radio stations in the United States